The M. Chinnaswamy Stadium, also known as the Karnataka State Cricket Association Stadium, is a cricket stadium located in Bangalore, Karnataka. Flanked by the picturesque Cubbon Park, Queen's Road, Cubbon and uptown MG Road, this five-decade-old stadium is situated in the heart of the city of Bangalore It has a seating capacity of 40,000, and regularly hosts Test cricket, One Day Internationals (ODI), Twenty20 Internationals (T20i) and other First-class cricket matches, as well as musical and cultural events. The stadium is  the home ground of the Karnataka state cricket team and the Indian Premier League franchise Royal Challengers Bangalore. It is owned by the Government of Karnataka and has been leased out to the Karnataka State Cricket Association (KSCA) for a period of 100 years.

Formerly known as the Karnataka State Cricket Association Stadium, it was later rechristened in tribute to Mangalam Chinnaswamy, a lawyer from Mandya and the founding member of the Mysore State Cricket Association. He served the KSCA for four decades and was also president of the Board of Control for Cricket in India (BCCI) from 1977 to 1980.

It is the first cricket stadium in the world to use solar panels to generate a bulk of the electricity needed to run the stadium. This has been procured as by the "Go Green" initiative of the KSCA. As of 13 January 2020 it has hosted 22 Tests, 24 ODI

History and developments

With generous patronage from the Government of Karnataka, the foundation stone of this stadium was laid in 1969 and construction work commenced in 1970. The stadium was first used for First-class cricket matches during the 1972–73 season. It earned test status during the 1974–75 season when the West Indies toured India.

The Karnataka State Cricket Association (KSCA) stadium, as it was known was later renamed as a tribute to M. Chinnaswamy, who was the BCCI President from 1977 to 1980 and had served the KSCA. Born in Mandya in 1900, he was the founding member of the Mysore State Cricket Association and a lawyer by profession. He helped by other eminent people, was instrumental in prevailing upon the Karnataka Government of Karnataka to allot the ground for cricket in the prime MG Road area in 1969.

The first Test played at this stadium was on 22–29 November 1974. Incidentally, this was the debut Test match for the West Indian batting giants Viv Richards and Gordon Greenidge. The West Indians led by Clive Lloyd crushed M. A. K. Pataudi's Indian team by a massive margin of 256 runs. India registered their first Test win on this ground against the touring English team led by Tony Greig in 1976–77. The first ODI match at this venue was played on 6 September 1982. India defeated Sri Lanka by six wickets in that match.

Floodlights were first installed at this stadium for the 1996 Wills World Cup. The first match played here under lights was the quarter-final clash between arch-rivals India and Pakistan on 9 March 1996 in which India defeated Pakistan by 39 runs. In 2007, 3rd Test Match between India Vs Pakistan, Sourav Ganguly and Yuvraj Singh lead a 300 run partnership fightback from 61/4 breaking several records. India's 365/5 at stumps was the highest first day score in India. The 300 run partnership was the highest partnership at the stadium and the highest left-hander batsmen partnership. Sourav Ganguly's 239 is the highest left-hander score.

After the BCCI chose Bangalore as the centre for the National Cricket Academy in 2000, many budding cricketers have passed out of the academy housed on this ground. This stadium also served as venue for the 1996 Miss World pageant. The KSCA planned to increase the seating capacity to 70,000, as well as considered constructing a newer cricket stadium with seating capacity of 70,000–80,000. However, none of those plans have materialised as of now. Chinnaswamy Stadium is also the home ground of the Bangalore franchise team, the Royal Challengers Bangalore. The stadium was given a facelift for the first season of the IPL. It was painted in red and yellow, the team colours of the Royal Challengers and also the colours of the Karnataka flag (cultural flag). The crowds are electric during every season of the IPL and come out to support their home team in large numbers.

Crowd

Cricket World Cups
This stadium has hosted One Day International (ODI) matches for all editions of the World cups, when India was a host/co-host.

Quarter final match

ICC World Cup 2011, 15th Match, Group B

ICC World Cup 2011, 22nd Match, Group B

ICC World Cup 2011, 31st Match, Group A

ICC World Cup 2011, 35th Match, Group A

ICC World Cup 2011, 11th Match, Group B

Events 
Miss World 1996 beauty pageant was held in this stadium, it was the first ever that this event was organised in India. Irene Skliva of Greece became the winner.

Achievements and milestones
On 14 June 2018, Afghanistan played their first ever test match after being granted 'Test Status' by the ICC in 2017 against India at this venue.

Test match records

Batting

Bowling

Team records

Partnership records

All records correct .

One day international match records
Highest total: 383–6 – India v Australia 2 November 2013. The second was 347–2 – Australia v India, the third and fourth highest scores were tied at 338 in the India-England in 2011 world cup match.

Highest Run Chase : 329–7 – Ireland scored 329 (in 49.1 overs) against England's  327 runs from 50 overs, 2 March 2011, during world cup match.
 
Highest individual score: 209 scored by Rohit Sharma

The most runs were scored by Sachin Tendulkar (534 runs) followed by Rohit Sharma (437 runs) and Virender Sehwag (328 runs).

The most wickets were taken by Zaheer Khan (14 wickets) followed by Javagal Srinath (10 wickets) and Venkatesh Prasad & Kapil Dev (8 wickets each)

Gallery

See also
 List of Test cricket grounds

References

External links
M Chinnaswamy Stadium Notable Events 
Details on Cricinfo

Test cricket grounds in India
Sports venues in Bangalore
Cricket grounds in Karnataka
Cricket in Bangalore
Buildings and structures completed in 1969
1969 establishments in Mysore State
Royal Challengers Bangalore
1987 Cricket World Cup stadiums
1996 Cricket World Cup stadiums
2011 Cricket World Cup stadiums
20th-century architecture in India